Odin (from ) is a widely revered god in Germanic paganism. Norse mythology, the source of most surviving information about him, associates him with wisdom, healing, death, royalty, the gallows, knowledge, war, battle, victory, sorcery, poetry, frenzy, and the runic alphabet, and depicts him as the husband of the goddess Frigg.

Odin appears as a prominent god throughout the recorded history of Northern Europe, from the Roman occupation of regions of Germania (from  BCE) through movement of peoples during the Migration Period (4th to 6th centuries CE) and the Viking Age (8th to 11th centuries CE). In the modern period, the rural folklore of Germanic Europe continued to acknowledge Odin.  References to him appear in place names throughout regions historically inhabited by the ancient Germanic peoples, and the day of the week Wednesday bears his name in many Germanic languages, including in English.

In Old English texts, Odin holds a particular place as a euhemerized ancestral figure among royalty, and he is frequently referred to as a founding figure among various other Germanic peoples, such as the Langobards, while some Old Norse sources depict him as an enthroned ruler of the gods. Forms of his name appear frequently throughout the Germanic record, though narratives regarding Odin are mainly found in Old Norse works recorded in Iceland, primarily around the 13th century. These texts make up the bulk of modern understanding of Norse mythology.

He is known by hundreds of names. Odin is frequently portrayed as one-eyed and long-bearded, wielding a spear named Gungnir or appearing in disguise wearing a cloak and a broad hat. He is often accompanied by his animal familiars—the wolves Geri and Freki and the ravens Huginn and Muninn, who bring him information from all over —and he rides the flying, eight-legged steed Sleipnir across the sky and into the underworld. In these texts he frequently seeks greater knowledge, most famously by obtaining the Mead of Poetry, and makes wagers with his wife Frigg over his endeavors. He takes part both in the creation of the world by slaying the primordial being  and in giving life to the first two humans Ask and Embla. He also provides mankind knowledge of runic writing and poetry, showing aspects of a culture hero. He has a particular association with the Yule holiday.

In later folklore, Odin sometimes appears as a leader of the Wild Hunt, a ghostly procession of the dead through the winter sky. He is associated with charms and other forms of magic, particularly in Old English and Old Norse texts.

The figure of Odin is a frequent subject of interest in Germanic studies, and scholars have advanced numerous theories regarding his development. Other approaches focus on Odin's place in the historical record, exploring whether Odin derives from Proto-Indo-European mythology or developed later in Germanic society. In the modern period, Odin has inspired numerous works of poetry, music, and other cultural expressions. He is venerated with other Germanic gods in most forms of the new religious movement Heathenry; some branches focus particularly on him.

Name

Etymological origin 
The Old Norse theonym Óðinn (runic  on the Ribe skull fragment) is a cognate of other medieval Germanic names, including Old English Wōden, Old Saxon Wōdan, Old Dutch Wuodan, and Old High German Wuotan (Old Bavarian Wûtan). They all derive from the reconstructed Proto-Germanic masculine theonym *Wōðanaz (or *Wōdunaz). Translated as 'lord of frenzy', or as 'leader of the possessed', *Wōðanaz stems from the Proto-Germanic adjective *wōðaz ('possessed, inspired, delirious, raging') attached to the suffix *-naz ('master of'). Internal and comparative evidence all point to the ideas of a divine possession or inspiration, and an ecstatic divination. In his Gesta Hammaburgensis ecclesiae pontificum (1075–1080 AD), Adam of Bremen explicitly associates Wotan with the Latin term furor, which can be translated as 'rage', 'fury', 'madness', or 'frenzy' (Wotan id est furor : "Odin, that is, furor"). As of 2011, an attestation of Proto-Norse Woðinz, on the Strängnäs stone, has been accepted as probably authentic, but the name may be used as a related adjective instead meaning "with a gift for (divine) possession" (ON: øðinn).

Other Germanic cognates derived from *wōðaz include Gothic woþs ('possessed'), Old Norse óðr ('mad, frantic, furious'), Old English wōd ('insane, frenzied') and Dutch woed ('frantic, wild, crazy'), along with the substantivized forms Old Norse óðr ('mind, wit, sense; song, poetry'), Old English wōþ ('sound, noise; voice, song'), Old High German wuot ('thrill, violent agitation') and Middle Dutch woet ('rage, frenzy'), from the same root as the original adjective. The Proto-Germanic terms *wōðīn ('madness, fury') and *wōðjanan ('to rage') can also be reconstructed. Early epigraphic attestations of the adjective include un-wōdz ('calm one', i.e. 'not-furious'; 200 CE) and wōdu-rīde ('furious rider'; 400 CE).

Philologist Jan de Vries has argued that the Old Norse deities Óðinn and Óðr were probably originally connected (as in the doublet Ullr–Ullinn), with Óðr (*wōðaz) being the elder form and the ultimate source of the name Óðinn (*wōða-naz). He further suggested that the god of rage Óðr–Óðinn stood in opposition to the god of glorious majesty Ullr–Ullinn in a similar manner to the Vedic contrast between Varuna and Mitra.

The adjective *wōðaz ultimately stems from a Pre-Germanic form *uoh₂-tós, which is related to the Proto-Celtic terms *wātis, meaning 'seer, sooth-sayer' (cf. Gaulish wāteis, Old Irish fáith 'prophet') and *wātus, meaning 'prophesy, poetic inspiration' (cf. Old Irish fáth 'prophetic wisdom, maxims', Old Welsh guaut 'prophetic verse, panegyric'). According to some scholars, the Latin term vātēs ('prophet, seer') is probably a Celtic loanword from the Gaulish language, making *uoh₂-tós ~ *ueh₂-tus ('god-inspired') a shared religious term common to Germanic and Celtic rather than an inherited word of earlier Proto-Indo-European (PIE) origin. In the case a borrowing scenario is excluded, a PIE etymon *(H)ueh₂-tis ('prophet, seer') can also be posited as the common ancestor of the attested Germanic, Celtic and Latin forms.

Other names 
More than 170 names are recorded for Odin; the names are variously descriptive of attributes of the god, refer to myths involving him, or refer to religious practices associated with him. This multitude makes Odin the god with the most known names among the Germanic peoples. Professor Steve Martin has pointed out that the name Odinsberg (Ounesberry, Ounsberry, Othenburgh) in Cleveland Yorkshire, now corrupted to Roseberry (Topping), may derive from the time of the Anglian settlements, with nearby Newton under Roseberry and Great Ayton having Anglo Saxon suffixes. The very dramatic rocky peak was an obvious place for divine association, and  may have replaced Bronze Age/Iron Age beliefs of divinity there, given that a hoard of bronze votive axes and other objects was buried by the summit. It could be a rare example, then, of Nordic-Germanic theology displacing earlier Celtic mythology in an imposing place of tribal prominence.

In his opera cycle Der Ring des Nibelungen, Richard Wagner refers to the god as Wotan, a spelling of his own invention which combines the Old High German Wuotan with the Low German Wodan.

Origin of Wednesday 
The modern English weekday name Wednesday derives from Old English Wōdnesdæg, meaning 'day of Wōden'. Cognate terms are found in other Germanic languages, such as Middle Low German and Middle Dutch Wōdensdach (modern Dutch woensdag), Old Frisian Wērnisdei (≈ Wērendei) and Old Norse Óðinsdagr (cf. Danish, Norwegian, Swedish onsdag). All of these terms derive from Late Proto-Germanic *Wodanesdag ('Day of Wōðanaz'), a calque of Latin Mercurii dies ('Day of Mercury'; cf. modern Italian mercoledì, French mercredi, Spanish miércoles).

Attestations

Roman era to Migration Period

They regard it as a religious duty to offer to him, on fixed days, human as well as other sacrificial victims. Hercules and Mars they appease by animal offerings of the permitted kind" and adds that a portion of the  also venerate "Isis". The "Isis" of the Suebi has been debated and may represent "Freyja".

Anthony Birley noted that Odin's apparent identification with Mercury has little to do with Mercury's classical role of being messenger of the gods, but appears to be due to Mercury's role of psychopomp. Other contemporary evidence may also have led to the equation of Odin with Mercury; Odin, like Mercury, may have at this time already been pictured with a staff and hat, may have been considered a trader god, and the two may have been seen as parallel in their roles as wandering deities. But their rankings in their respective religious spheres may have been very different. Also, Tacitus's "among the gods Mercury is the one they principally worship" is an exact quote from Julius Caesar's  (1st century BCE) in which Caesar is referring to the Gauls and not the Germanic peoples. Regarding the Germanic peoples, Caesar states: "[T]hey consider the gods only the ones that they can see, the Sun, Fire and the Moon", which scholars reject as clearly mistaken, regardless of what may have led to the statement.

There is no direct, undisputed evidence for the worship of Odin/Mercury among the Goths, and the existence of a cult of Odin among them is debated. Richard North and Herwig Wolfram have both argued that the Goths did not worship Odin, Wolfram contending that the use of Greek names of the week in Gothic provides evidence of that. One possible reading of the Gothic Ring of Pietroassa is that the inscription "gutaniowi hailag" means "sacred to Wodan-Jove", but this is highly disputed.

The earliest clear reference to Odin by name is found on a C-bracteate discovered in Denmark in 2020. Dated to as early as the 400s, the bracteate features a Proto-Norse Elder Futhark inscription reading "He is Odin’s man" (iz Wōd[a]nas weraz). Although the English kingdoms were converted to Christianity by the 7th century, Odin is frequently listed as a founding figure among the Old English royalty.

Odin is also either directly or indirectly mentioned a few times in the surviving Old English poetic corpus, including the Nine Herbs Charm and likely also the Old English rune poem. Odin may also be referenced in the riddle Solomon and Saturn. In the Nine Herbs Charm, Odin is said to have slain a wyrm (serpent, European dragon) by way of nine "glory twigs". Preserved from an 11th-century manuscript, the poem is, according to Bill Griffiths, "one of the most enigmatic of Old English texts". The section that mentions Odin is as follows:

The next stanza comments on the creation of the herbs chervil and fennel while hanging in heaven by the 'wise lord' and before sending them down among mankind. Regarding this, Griffith comments that "In a Christian context 'hanging in heaven' would refer to the crucifixion; but (remembering that Woden was mentioned a few lines previously) there is also a parallel, perhaps a better one, with Odin, as his crucifixion was associated with learning." The Old English gnomic poem Maxims I also mentions Odin by name in the (alliterative) phrase , ('Woden made idols'), in which he is contrasted with and denounced against the Christian God.

The Old English rune poem recounts the Old English runic alphabet, the futhorc. The stanza for the rune  reads as follows:

The first word of this stanza,  (Latin 'mouth') is a homophone for Old English , a particularly heathen word for 'god'. Due to this and the content of the stanzas, several scholars have posited that this poem is censored, having originally referred to Odin. In Old English, it could be used as an element in first names: Osric, Oswald, Osmund, etc. but it was not used as a word to refer to the God of Christians. Woden was equated with Mercury, the god of eloquence (among other things). The tales about the Norse god Odin tell how he gave one of his eyes in return for wisdom; he also won the mead of poetic inspiration. Luckily for Christian rune-masters, the Latin word  could be substituted without ruining the sense, to keep the outward form of the rune name without obviously referring to Woden."

In the prose narrative of Solomon and Saturn, "Mercurius the Giant" is referred to as an inventor of letters. This may also be a reference to Odin, who is in Norse mythology the founder of the runic alphabets, and the gloss a continuation of the practice of equating Odin with Mercury found as early as Tacitus. One of the Solomon and Saturn poems is additionally in the style of later Old Norse material featuring Odin, such as the Old Norse poem , featuring Odin and the  engaging in a deadly game of wits.

The 7th-century , and Paul the Deacon's 8th-century  derived from it, recount a founding myth of the Langobards (Lombards), a Germanic people who ruled a region of the Italian Peninsula. The Vandals, ruled by Ambri and Assi, came to the Winnili with their army and demanded that they pay them tribute or prepare for war. Ybor, Aio, and their mother Gambara rejected their demands for tribute. Ambri and Assi then asked the god Godan for victory over the Winnili, to which Godan responded (in the longer version in the ): "Whom I shall first see when at sunrise, to them will I give the victory."

Meanwhile, Ybor and Aio called upon Frea, Godan's wife. Frea counselled them that "at sunrise the Winnil[i] should come, and that their women, with their hair let down around the face in the likeness of a beard should also come with their husbands". At sunrise, Frea turned Godan's bed around to face east and woke him. Godan saw the Winnili and their whiskered women and asked, "who are those Long-beards?" Frea responded to Godan, "As you have given them a name, give them also the victory". Godan did so, "so that they should defend themselves according to his counsel and obtain the victory". Thenceforth the Winnili were known as the Langobards ('long-beards').

Writing in the mid-7th century, Jonas of Bobbio wrote that earlier that century the Irish missionary Columbanus disrupted an offering of beer to Odin (vodano) "(whom others called Mercury)" in Swabia.

A 10th-century manuscript found in Merseburg, Germany, features a heathen invocation known as the Second Merseburg Incantation, which calls upon Odin and other gods and goddesses from the continental Germanic pantheon to assist in healing a horse:

Viking Age to post-Viking Age

In the 11th century, chronicler Adam of Bremen recorded in a scholion of his  that a statue of Thor, whom Adam describes as "mightiest", sat enthroned in the Temple at Uppsala (located in Gamla Uppsala, Sweden) flanked by Wodan (Odin) and "Fricco". Regarding Odin, Adam defines him as "frenzy" and says that he "rules war and gives people strength against the enemy" and that the people of the temple depict him as wearing armour, "as our people depict Mars". According to Adam, the people of Uppsala had appointed priests (gothi) to each of the gods, who were to offer up sacrifices (blót), and in times of war sacrifices were made to images of Odin.

In the 12th century, centuries after Norway was "officially" Christianised, Odin was still being invoked by the population, as evidenced by a stick bearing a runic message found among the Bryggen inscriptions in Bergen, Norway. On the stick, both Thor and Odin are called upon for help; Thor is asked to "receive" the reader, and Odin to "own" them.

Poetic Edda

Odin is mentioned or appears in most poems of the Poetic Edda, compiled in the 13th century from traditional source material reaching back to the pagan period.

Among the information the  recounts is the story of the first human beings (Ask and Embla), found and given life by a trio of gods; Odin, and :
In stanza 17 of the Poetic Edda poem , the  reciting the poem states that ,  and Odin once found Ask and Embla on land.

The meaning of these gifts has been a matter of scholarly disagreement and translations therefore vary.

The  tells Odin that she knows where he has hidden his eye; in the spring , and from it " drinks mead every morning". After Odin gives her necklaces, she continues to recount more information, including a list of valkyries, referred to as  'the ladies of War Lord'; in other words, the ladies of Odin. Odin will be consumed by the wolf, yet Odin's son  will avenge him by stabbing the wolf in the heart. After the world is burned and renewed, the surviving and returning gods will meet and recall Odin's deeds and "ancient runes".

The poem  (Old Norse 'Sayings of the High One') consists entirely of wisdom verse attributed to Odin. Among the various scenes that Odin recounts is his self-sacrifice:

Odin is associated with hanging and gallows; John Lindow comments that "the hanged 'ride' the gallows".

The woman's corslet is so tight that it seems to have grown into the woman's body.  uses his sword Gram to cut the corslet, starting from the neck of the corslet downwards, he continues cutting down her sleeves, and takes the corslet off her.

In the second stanza, the woman explains that Odin placed a sleeping spell on her which she could not break, and due to that spell she has been asleep a long time.  asks for her name, and the woman gives  a horn of mead to help him retain her words in his memory. The woman recites a heathen prayer in two stanzas. A prose narrative explains that the woman is named  and that she is a valkyrie.

A narrative relates that  explains to  that there were two kings fighting one another. Odin had promised one of these——victory in battle, yet she had "brought down"  in battle. Odin pricked her with a sleeping-thorn in consequence, told her that she would never again "fight victoriously in battle", and condemned her to marriage. In response,  told Odin she had sworn a great oath that she would never wed a man who knew fear.  asks  to share with him her wisdom of all worlds. The poem continues in verse, where  provides  with knowledge in inscribing runes, mystic wisdom, and prophecy.

Prose Edda
Odin is mentioned throughout the books of the Prose Edda, composed in the 13th century and drawing from earlier traditional material. The god is introduced at length in chapter nine of the Prose Edda book Gylfaginning, which explains that he is described as ruling over Asgard, the domain of the gods, on his throne, that he is the 'father of all', and that from him all the gods, all of humankind (by way of Ask and Embla), and everything else he has made or produced. According to Gylfaginning, in Asgard:

There the gods and their descendants lived and there took place as a result many developments both on earth and aloft. In the city there is a seat called Hlidskialf, and when Odin sat in that throne he saw over all worlds and every man's activity and understood everything he saw. His wife was called Frigg Fiorgvin's daughter, and from them is descended the family line that we call the Æsir race, who have resided in Old Asgard and the realms that belong to it, and that whole line of descent is of divine origin. And this is why he can be called All-father, that he is father of all gods and of men and of everything that has been brought into being by him and his power. The earth was his daughter and his wife. Out of her he begot the first of his ons, that is Asa-Thor.

In the Prose Edda book  (chapter 38), the enthroned figure of High (Harr), tells  (king  in disguise) that two ravens named Huginn and Muninn sit on Odin's shoulders. The ravens tell Odin everything they see and hear. Odin sends Huginn and Muninn out at dawn, and the birds fly all over the world before returning at dinner-time. As a result, Odin is kept informed of many events. High adds that it is from this association that Odin is referred to as "raven-god".

In the same chapter, the enthroned figure of High explains that Odin gives all of the food on his table to his wolves Geri and Freki and that Odin requires no food, for wine is to him both meat and drink.

Heimskringla and sagas

Odin is mentioned several times in the sagas that make up . Odin is introduced in chapter two, where he is said to have lived in "the land or home of the ", the capital of which being .  was ruled by Odin, a great chieftain, and was "a great place for sacrifices". It was the custom there that twelve temple priests were ranked highest; they administered sacrifices and held judgements over men. "Called  or chiefs", the people were obliged to serve under them and respect them. Odin was a very successful warrior and travelled widely, conquering many lands. Odin was so successful that he never lost a battle. As a result, according to the saga, men came to believe that "it was granted to him" to win all battles. The men placed all of their faith in Odin, and wherever they called his name they would receive assistance from doing so. Odin was often gone for great spans of time.

Chapter 3 says that Odin had two brothers, Vé and Vili. While Odin was gone, his brothers governed his realm. Once Odin was gone for so long that the  believed that he would not return, his brothers began to divvy up Odin's inheritance, "but his wife  they shared between them. However, afterwards, [Odin] returned and took possession of his wife again". Chapter 4 describes the  War. According to the chapter, Odin "made war on the ". The  defended their land and the battle turned to a stalemate, both sides having devastated each other's lands. As part of a peace agreement, the two sides exchanged hostages.

In , the great king  and his wife (unnamed) are unable to conceive a child; "that lack displeased them both, and they fervently implored the gods that they might have a child. It is said that  heard their prayers and told Odin what they asked", and the two gods subsequently sent a Valkyrie to present  an apple that falls onto his lap while he sits on a burial mound and 's wife subsequently becomes pregnant with the namesake of the  family line.

In the 13th century legendary saga , the poem  contains a riddle that mentions  and Odin:
36.  said:
Who are the twain
that on ten feet run?
three eyes they have,
but only one tail.
All right guess now
this riddle, !

 said:
Good is thy riddle,
and guessed it is:

Modern folklore

Local folklore and folk practice recognised Odin as late as the 19th century in Scandinavia. In a work published in the mid-19th century, Benjamin Thorpe records that on Gotland, "many traditions and stories of Odin the Old still live in the mouths of the people". Local legend dictates that after it was opened, "there burst forth a wondrous fire, like a flash of lightning", and that a coffin full of flint and a lamp were excavated. Thorpe additionally relates that legend has it that a priest who dwelt around  had once sowed some rye, and that when the rye sprang up, so came Odin riding from the hills each evening. Odin was so massive that he towered over the farm-yard buildings, spear in hand. Halting before the entry way, he kept all from entering or leaving all night, which occurred every night until the rye was cut.

Thorpe notes that numerous other traditions existed in Sweden at the time of his writing.

Thorpe records (1851) that in Sweden, "when a noise, like that of carriages and horses, is heard by night, the people say: 'Odin is passing by'".

Archaeological record

References to or depictions of Odin appear on numerous objects. Migration Period (5th and 6th century CE) gold bracteates (types A, B, and C) feature a depiction of a human figure above a horse, holding a spear and flanked by one or two birds. Like the Prose Edda description of the ravens, a bird is sometimes depicted at the ear of the human, or at the ear of the horse. Bracteates have been found in Denmark, Sweden, Norway and, in smaller numbers, England and areas south of Denmark. Austrian Germanist Rudolf Simek states that these bracteates may depict Odin and his ravens healing a horse and may indicate that the birds were originally not simply his battlefield companions but also "Odin's helpers in his veterinary function."

Vendel Period helmet plates (from the 6th or 7th century) found in a grave in Sweden depict a helmeted figure holding a spear and a shield while riding a horse, flanked by two birds. The plate has been interpreted as Odin accompanied by two birds; his ravens.

Two of the 8th century picture stones from the island of Gotland, Sweden depict eight-legged horses, which are thought by most scholars to depict : the Tjängvide image stone and the Ardre VIII image stone. Both stones feature a rider sitting atop an eight-legged horse, which some scholars view as Odin. Above the rider on the  image stone is a horizontal figure holding a spear, which may be a valkyrie, and a female figure greets the rider with a cup. The scene has been interpreted as a rider arriving at the world of the dead. The mid-7th century  stone bearing the Odinic name  (Old Norse 'army god') may be interpreted as depicting .

The back of each bird features a mask-motif, and the feet of the birds are shaped like the heads of animals. The feathers of the birds are also composed of animal-heads. Together, the animal-heads on the feathers form a mask on the back of the bird. The birds have powerful beaks and fan-shaped tails, indicating that they are ravens. The brooches were intended to be worn on each shoulder, after Germanic Iron Age fashion. Archaeologist  comments that while the symbolism of the brooches is open to debate, the shape of the beaks and tail feathers confirms the brooch depictions are ravens.  notes that "raven-shaped ornaments worn as a pair, after the fashion of the day, one on each shoulder, makes one's thoughts turn towards Odin's ravens and the cult of Odin in the Germanic Iron Age."  says that Odin is associated with disguise, and that the masks on the ravens may be portraits of Odin.

The  tapestry fragments, discovered within the Viking Age  ship burial in Norway, features a scene containing two black birds hovering over a horse, possibly originally leading a wagon (as a part of a procession of horse-led wagons on the tapestry).

Excavations in Ribe, Denmark have recovered a Viking Age lead metal-caster's mould and 11 identical casting-moulds. These objects depict a moustached man wearing a helmet that features two head-ornaments. Archaeologist Stig Jensen proposes these head-ornaments should be interpreted as Huginn and Muninn, and the wearer as Odin. He notes that "similar depictions occur everywhere the Vikings went—from eastern England to Russia and naturally also in the rest of Scandinavia."

A portion of Thorwald's Cross (a partly surviving runestone erected at Kirk Andreas on the Isle of Man) depicts a bearded human holding a spear downward at a wolf, his right foot in its mouth, and a large bird on his shoulder. Rundata dates the cross to 940, while Pluskowski dates it to the 11th century.

Below the beast and the man is a depiction of a legless, helmeted man, with his arms in a prostrate position. The Younger Futhark inscription on the stone bears a commonly seen memorial dedication, but is followed by an encoded runic sequence that has been described as "mysterious," and "an interesting magic formula which is known from all over the ancient Norse world."

The silver object depicts a person sitting on a throne. The throne features the heads of animals and is flanked by two birds. The Roskilde Museum identifies the figure as Odin sitting on his throne , flanked by the ravens Huginn and Muninn.

Due to the context of its placement on some objects, some scholars have interpreted this symbol as referring to Odin.

Davidson says that similar symbols are found beside figures of wolves and ravens on "certain cremation urns" from Anglo-Saxon cemeteries in East Anglia. According to Davidson, Odin's connection to cremation is known, and it does not seem unreasonable to connect with Odin in Anglo-Saxon England. Davidson proposes further connections between Odin's role as bringer of ecstasy by way of the etymology of the god's name.

Origin and theories
Beginning with Henry Petersen's doctoral dissertation in 1876, which proposed that Thor was the indigenous god of Scandinavian farmers and Odin a later god proper to chieftains and poets, many scholars of Norse mythology in the past viewed Odin as having been imported from elsewhere. The idea was developed by Bernhard Salin on the basis of motifs in the petroglyphs and bracteates, and with reference to the Prologue of the Prose Edda, which presents the Æsir as having migrated into Scandinavia. Salin proposed that both Odin and the runes were introduced from Southeastern Europe in the Iron Age. Other scholars placed his introduction at different times; Axel Olrik, during the Migration Age as a result of Gaulish influence.

In the 16th century and by the entire Vasa dynasty, Odin (as ) was officially considered the first King of Sweden by that country's government and historians. This was based on an embellished list of rulers invented by Johannes Magnus and officially adopted in the reign of King Carl IX, who, though numbered accordingly, actually was only the third Swedish king of that name.

Another approach to Odin has been in terms of his function and attributes. Many early scholars interpreted him as a wind-god or especially as a death-god. He has also been interpreted in the light of his association with ecstatic practices, and Jan de Vries compared him to the Hindu god Rudra and the Greek Hermes.

Modern influence

The god Odin has been a source of inspiration for artists working in fine art, literature, and music.

Robert E. Howard's story "The Cairn on the Headland" assumes that Odin was a malevolent demonic spirit, that he was mortally wounded when taking human form and fighting among the Vikings in the Battle of Clontarf (1014), that lay comatose for nearly a thousand years—to wake up, nearly cause great havoc in modern Dublin but being exorcised by the story's protagonist helped by the ghost of a Catholic saint.

Science fiction writer Poul Anderson's story The Sorrow of Odin the Goth asserts that Odin was in fact a twentieth-century American time traveler, who sought to study the culture of the ancient Goths and ended up being regarded as a god and starting an enduring myth.

Odin was adapted as a character by Marvel Comics, first appearing in the Journey into Mystery series in 1962. Sir Anthony Hopkins portrayed the character in the Marvel Cinematic Universe films Thor (2011), Thor: The Dark World (2013), and Thor: Ragnarok (2017).

Odin is featured in a number of video games. In the 2002 Ensemble Studios game Age of Mythology, Odin is one of three major gods Norse players can worship. Odin is also mentioned through Santa Monica Studio's 2018 game God of War and appears as the main antagonist in its 2022 sequel God of War Ragnarök. He is a major influence in the 2020 Ubisoft game Assassin's Creed Valhalla in the form of an Isu (a godlike, humanoid species within the Assassin's Creed universe) of the same name. The primary protagonist, Eivor, who the player controls throughout the game is revealed to be a sage, or human reincarnation, of Odin. Odin is also one of the playable gods in the third-person multiplayer online battle arena game Smite.

References

Sources

 Bellows, Henry Adams (Trans.) (1936). The Poetic Edda. Princeton University Press. New York: The American-Scandinavian Foundation.
 Birley, Anthony R. (Trans.) (1999). Agricola and Germany. Oxford World's Classics. 
 
 Brooks, James. 2023. "Oldest reference to Norse god Odin found in Danish treasure". ABC News. March 8, 2023. Accessed March 8, 2023.
 Chadwick, H. M. (1899). The Cult of Othin: An Essay in the Ancient Religion of the North. Clay & Sons. 
 Cleasby, Richard and Guðbrandur Vigfússon. Rev. Craigie, William A. (1975) An Icelandic–English Dictionary. 2nd ed., repr. Oxford Clarendon Press. 
 Cross, James E. and Thomas D. Hill (1982). The Prose Solomon and Saturn and Adrian and Ritheus. University of Toronto Press.
 
 
 
 
 Dronke, Ursula (Trans.) (1997). The Poetic Edda: Volume II: Mythological Poems. Oxford University Press. 
 
 Faulkes, Anthony (Trans.) (1995). Edda. Everyman. 
 Foulke, William Dudley (Trans.) Ed. Edward Peters. (2003 [1974]). History of the Lombards. University of Pennsylvania Press. 
 
 Griffiths, Bill (2006 [2003]). Aspects of Anglo-Saxon Magic. Anglo-Saxon Books. 
 Herbert, Kathleen (2007 [1994]). Looking for the Lost Gods of England. Anglo-Saxon Books. 
 Hirschfeld, Max (1889). Untersuchungen zur Lokasenna, Acta Germanica 1.1, Berlin: Mayer & Müller. 

 Hollander, Lee Milton (1936). Old Norse Poems: The Most Important Nonskaldic Verse Not Included in the Poetic Edda.  Columbia University Press
 
 
 Larrington, Carolyne (Trans.) (1999). The Poetic Edda. Oxford World's Classics. 
 
 MacLeod, Mindy & Mees, Bernard (2006). Runic Amulets and Magic Objects. Boydell Press. 
 Munro, Dana Carleton (Trans.) (1895). Life of St. Columban. The Department of History of the University of Pennsylvania.
 North, Richard (1997). Heathen Gods in Old English Literature. Cambridge University Press. 
 
 
 
 Pollington, Stephen (2008). Rudiments of Runelore. Anglo-Saxon Books. 

 Schach, Paul (1985). "Some Thoughts on Völuspá" as collected in Glendinning, R. J. Bessason, Heraldur (Editors). Edda: a Collection of Essays. University of Manitoba Press. 
 Simek, Rudolf (2007) translated by Angela Hall. Dictionary of Northern Mythology. D.S. Brewer. 
 
 Thorpe, Benjamin (1851). Northern Mythology, Compromising the Principal Traditions and Superstitions of Scandinavia, North Germany, and the Netherlands: Compiled from Original and Other Sources. 3 vols. Volume 2 Scandinavian Popular Traditions and Superstitions. Lumley. 
 Thorpe, Benjamin (Trans.) (1866). Edda Sæmundar Hinns Frôða: The Edda of Sæmund the Learned. Part I. London: Trübner & Co.
 
 
 Williamson, Craig (2011). A Feast of Creatures: Anglo-Saxon Riddle-Songs. University of Pennsylvania Press.

External links

 MyNDIR (My Norse Digital Image Repository) Illustrations of Óðinn from manuscripts and early print books. Clicking on the thumbnail will give you the full image and information concerning it.

 
Æsir
Arts gods
Creator gods
Death gods
Dragonslayers
Germanic gods
Hunting gods
Killed deities
Life-death-rebirth gods
Magic gods
Mythological kings of Sweden
Mythological rapists
Norse gods
Oracular gods
Völsung cycle
War gods
Wisdom gods
Norse underworld